Lachenalia aloides (opal flower) is a species of flowering plant in the family Asparagaceae, native to the Western Cape of South Africa. The Latin aloides literally means "aloe-like"; though L. aloides, despite its similarity, does not belong to the same family of plants as aloes.

Numerous cultivars have been bred for garden use.  They require a sheltered, frost-free position or under glass. The following have gained the Royal Horticultural Society's Award of Garden Merit:
L. aloides var. aurea
L. aloides var. quadricolor

References

aloides